Bernard Shandon Rodey (March 1, 1856 – March 10, 1927) was an Irish-born American politician who was a Delegate from the New Mexico Territory and later a federal judge in Puerto Rico.

Early life 
Rodey was born in County Mayo, Ireland. He emigrated with his parents in 1862 to Canada, and was educated in Sherbrooke, Quebec. After leaving Canada, he went to Massachusetts where he studied law at Harvard University. Rodey moved to Albuquerque, New Mexico in 1881 where he became employed as a private secretary for the Atlantic and Pacific Railroad Company. He left the railroad to practice law and was admitted to the bar in 1883. Active in politics from a young age, Bernard was elected to the territorial senate representing Bernalillo County in 1889. He introduced legislation to create the University of New Mexico. The bill detailed the acquisition of funds and land for the institution, locating its construction in New Albuquerque. Passage of the bill on February 28, 1889 earned Rodey the title "Father of the University" and Rodey Hall was named in his honor.

Congressional seat 
In 1900 Rodey was elected as a Republican to the U.S. House of Representatives as a Delegate from the New Mexico Territory. During his two terms in office, he was best known for his unrelenting fight to gain statehood not only for New Mexico, but Arizona and Oklahoma as well. He fought against a consortium of Eastern senators led by Albert J. Beveridge of Indiana that was threatened by the admission of Western territories as states. Rodey was defeated in a primary fight against William Henry Andrews in 1904.

Judicial tenure 

After his terms in Congress, President Theodore Roosevelt appointed Rodey as federal judge for the United States District Court for Puerto Rico in 1906. Rodey's tenure on the bench was controversial and he became involved in the political dispute that culminated in adoption of the Olmsted Amendment and led some prominent Puerto Rican attorneys to unsuccessfully advocate for the abolition of the federal court in Puerto Rico or severely limit its jurisdiction.  Rodey left the bench in 1910 and was succeeded by John J. Jenkins.

At the 1908 Republican National Convention, Rodey was one of several Republicans who convinced Taft to promise statehood for New Mexico and Arizona in his election campaign. Rodey was appointed by President William Taft as a federal government attorney in the Territory of Alaska, and then helped investigate a coal scandal in Alaska in 1913. He returned to Albuquerque to found the law firm of Rodey and Rodey, which ultimately grew into the present-day firm of Rodey, Dickason, Sloan, Akin & Robb.

Private  life 
Although President Warren Harding attempted to persuade Rodey back into politics, he never sought another public office. He died in Albuquerque in 1927 at the age of 71.

References 

1856 births
1927 deaths
Politicians from Albuquerque, New Mexico
Harvard University alumni
Members of the New Mexico Territorial Legislature
Delegates to the United States House of Representatives from New Mexico Territory
Irish emigrants to the United States (before 1923)
Judges of the United States District Court for the District of Puerto Rico
United States Article I federal judges appointed by Theodore Roosevelt
20th-century American judges
New Mexico Republicans
Republican Party (Puerto Rico) politicians